Pimelea floribunda is a species of flowering plant in the family Thymelaeaceae and is endemic to the south-west of Western Australia. It is a shrub with narrowly elliptic to egg-shaped leaves arranged in opposite pairs, and drooping, head-like clusters of white or cream-coloured, tube-shaped flowers.

Description
Flowering occurs from July to October.

Taxonomy
Pimelea floribunda was first formally described in 1857 by Carl Meissner in de Candolle's Prodromus Systematis Naturalis Regni Vegetabilis from specimens collected by James Drummond. The specific epithet (floribunda) means "flowering profusely".

Distribution and habitat
This pimelea grows on coastal sand dunes, limestone ridges and lateritic breakaways in near-coastal areas between  Northampton, and Wanneroo, in the Avon Wheatbelt, Geraldton Sandplains, Jarrah Forestand Swan Coastal Plain bioregions of south-western Western Australia.

Conservation status
Pimelea floribunda is listed as "not threatened" by the Government of Western Australia Department of Biodiversity, Conservation and Attractions.

References

Malvales of Australia
floribunda
Flora of Western Australia
Taxa named by Carl Meissner
Plants described in 1857